Lenasia Stadium, previously known as Lenz Stadium and MR Varachia Stadium is a cricket ground in Johannesburg, South Africa.  The ground was used regularly by Transvaal from 1973 until 1991.  It has also hosted two women's One Day Internationals, and two youth One Day Internationals.

References

Cricket grounds in South Africa
Sports venues in Johannesburg